is a town located in Hidaka Subprefecture, Hokkaido, Japan.

Geography
Hidaka Town is divided into two exclaves, which coincide with the former towns of Hidaka and Monbetsu. The town of Biratori lies between the two wards separating them. Hidaka Ward (Hidaka-ku) lies in the Hidaka Mountains at a cross road leading to Sapporo, Furano, Obihiro, and Biratori. These crossroads lead to Hidaka and Nisshō passes. Monbetsu Ward (Monbetsu-ku) lies on the coast of the Pacific Ocean at the outlet of the Saru River.

A train line used to run up to Hidaka along the Saru River. The train carried lumber from the logging camps down to the coast. The train line is no longer used.

Climate

Transport

Rail
Hidaka was served by the JR Hokkaido Hidaka Main Line. Plans to restore this section of the line have been abandoned, due to declining passenger numbers and very high maintenance costs, and the section was officially closed on 1 April 2021 and replaced by a bus service.

Stations in Hidaka:  -  -  -  -

Demographics
As of September 2016, Hidaka had a population of 12,596.

History
On March 1, 2006, the town of Monbetsu was merged into Hidaka.

Sports
Hidaka also has a ski slope called the Hidaka Skijo, which has 4 chairlifts and an onsen called Kogenso.

Art and Culture
There is also a Shonen Shizen no Ie Boys' Nature House.

Mascot 

Her name means "walnut". She is a squirrel who loves walnuts grown in the town. Her companion is  who is a horse from Monbetsu. Tonekko-kun's designer is Hiroshi Kurogane.

References

External links

Official Website 

Towns in Hokkaido